Aamer Mahmood (born 16 December 1977 in Peshawar) is a Pakistani former first-class cricketer active 1996–2001 who played for Peshawar. Aamer Mahmood was a right-handed batsman and a right-arm fast medium pace bowler.

References

1977 births
Pakistani cricketers
Peshawar cricketers
Living people